The R398 is a Regional Route in South Africa that connects Middelburg with Britstown via Richmond.

External links
 Routes Travel Info

References

Regional Routes in the Eastern Cape
Regional Routes in the Northern Cape